Henry Chadwick (October 5, 1824 – April 20, 1908) was an English-American sportswriter, baseball statistician and historian, often called the "Father of Baseball" for his early reporting on and contributions to the development of the game. He edited the first baseball guide that was sold to the public. He is credited with creating box scores, as well as creating the abbreviation "K" that designates a strikeout. He is said to have created the statistics of batting average and earned run average (ERA). He was posthumously inducted into the National Baseball Hall of Fame in 1938.

Early life
Chadwick was born on October 5, 1824 in Exeter, England. His grandfather, Andrew Chadwick, had been a close friend of theologian John Wesley. His father, James Chadwick, was a supporter of the French Revolution who also tutored John Dalton in music and botany. James Chadwick had served as editor of a publication known as the Western Times. Edwin Chadwick's mother had made James Chadwick a widower shortly after Edwin's birth.

Chadwick was the younger half-brother of Sir Edwin Chadwick, England's sanitary philosopher who developed environmental measures and laws designed to counteract the effects of the Industrial Revolution. Chadwick moved to Brooklyn with his family at the age of 12. Biographer Andrew Schiff writes that Henry Chadwick "was not brought up to value possessions or with an understanding of commerce and trade; rather he received an education that was drenched in moral philosophy and science." He began to write music and to teach piano and guitar.

In 1848, Chadwick married Jane Botts from Richmond, Virginia. Botts' father Alexander had been president of the Virginia State Council. She was also related to politician John Botts. Chadwick edited John Botts' work titled The Great Rebellion. Chadwick and his wife had three children, Richard Westlake Chadwick, in 1849, Susan Mary Chadwick, in 1851, and Rose Virginia Chadwick, 1853.

Chadwick became a frequent player of cricket and similar ball games such as rounders. He began covering cricket for numerous local newspapers such as the Long Island Star. He first came across organized baseball in 1856 as a cricket reporter for The New York Times, watching a match played between New York's Eagles and Gothams at the Elysian Fields in Hoboken, New Jersey. He focused his attention as a journalist and writer on baseball after joining the New York Clipper in 1857, and was also soon hired on to provide coverage for other New York papers including the Sunday Mercury.

Contributions to baseball

Promotion of the game
Chadwick was one of the prime movers in the rise of baseball to its popularity at the turn of the 20th century. A keen amateur statistician and professional writer, he helped sculpt the public perception of the game, as well as providing the basis for the records of teams' and players' achievements in the form of baseball statistics. He also served on baseball rules committees and influenced the game itself. He is sometimes referred to as "the father of baseball" because he facilitated the popularity of the sport in its early days.

Early baseball had a provision known as the "bound rule", which held that a fielder could catch a batted ball on one bounce and that it would still be recorded as an out. Chadwick was an outspoken critic of the rule for many years, stating that fielders should have to catch a ball on the fly for it to count as an out. In 1864, the bound rule was eliminated for balls hit into fair territory. The bound rule for foul balls persisted into the 1880s.

Chadwick edited The Beadle Dime Base-Ball Player, the first annual baseball guide on public sale, as well as the Spalding and Reach annual guides for a number of years and in this capacity promoted the game and influenced the infant discipline of sports journalism. In his 1861 Beadle guide, he listed totals of games played, outs, runs, home runs, and strikeouts for hitters on prominent clubs, the first database of its kind. His goal was to provide numerical evidence to prove which players helped a team to win.

In 1867 he accompanied the National Base Ball Club of Washington D.C. on their inaugural national tour, as their official scorer. The next year, Chadwick wrote the first hardcover baseball book, The Game of Base Ball. In 1874 was instrumental in organizing a tour of England which included games of both baseball and cricket.  In his role as journalist, he campaigned against the detrimental effects on the game of both alcohol and gambling.

Despite a friendship with Albert Spalding, Chadwick was scornful of the attempts to have Abner Doubleday declared the inventor of baseball.  "He means well", said Chadwick, "but he don't know". Chadwick later willed his baseball library to Spalding.

Author William Cook wrote that "Chadwick was at times a bit self-aggrandizing, but his heart was always deeply rooted in looking after the best interest of the game." An 1876 Chicago Tribune article attacked Chadwick's status as the father of baseball, saying in part that Chadwick "has had enough experience to have made himself a man of respect had heaven but given him a head ... he proceeded to call himself the '"Father of the Game,' and to assume much on the strength of the title. But he found an unruly child, and one which disinherited him with rapidity and ease." Cook writes that Chadwick may have been a victim of "Western journalism", a sensationalized style of writing.

Box scores and statistics

Chadwick is credited with devising the baseball box score (which he adapted from the cricket scorecard) for reporting game events. The first box score appeared in an 1859 issue of the Clipper. It was a grid with nine rows for players and nine columns for innings. The original box scores also created the often puzzling abbreviation for strikeout as "K" – "K" being the last letter of "struck" in "struck out". Chadwick assigned numbers to each defensive position for scorekeeping purposes, a system that remains in modern baseball scorekeeping.

Newspapers had previously tallied runs scored, but Chadwick's 1859 box score looked similar in structure to modern ones. Baseball researcher Bill James credits Chadwick's creation of the box score with his interest in the game, but he criticized Chadwick's omission of the walk from calculation of a player's batting average: ""What they failed to understand is that actually the batter has as much or a little more to do with when the walk occurs as the pitcher does. They ignored that element of it and that did distort the game for a lot of people." The box score was popularized in 1925 when Baseball Magazine republished Chadwick's 1859 Clipper article.
Chadwick is credited with devising statistical measures such as batting average and earned run average (ERA). He felt that batting average was the best representation of a batter's offensive skills. He initially scored walks as errors charged to the pitcher. Walks did not exist in cricket (though there is a penalty run for a wide) and upon learning about them in baseball, he felt that they did not have anything to do with offensive skill. He later removed walks entirely from baseball statistics. ERA originated not in the goal of measuring a pitcher's worth but to differentiate between runs caused by batting skill (hits) and lack of fielding skill (errors). He is also noted as believing fielding range to be a superior skill to avoiding errors.

Journalistic style
The following description of a game was written by Henry Chadwick and appeared in his Base Ball Memoranda.  It is typical of his style of sports journalism, and that of his time:

A Base Ball tourney had been held in Chicago on July 4, 1867, in which the Excelsiors of that city and the Forest City Club, of Rockford, had been the leading contestants.  The former had defeated the Forest City nine in two games, by the very close scores of 45–41 in one, and 28–25 in another, when the Forest Citys were invited to meet the Nationals at Chicago on July 25, a day which proved the most notable of the tour.  The contest took place at Dexter Park, before a vast crowd of spectators, the majority of whom looked to see the Nationals have almost a walk-over.  In the game A. G. Spalding was pitcher and Ross Barnes shortstop for the Forest City nine; these two afterwards becoming famous as star players of the Boston professional team of the early seventies.  Williams was pitcher for the Nationals and Frank Norton catcher.  The Nationals took the lead in the first innings by 3 to 2; but in the next two innings they added but five runs to their score, while the Forest Citys added thirteen to theirs, thereby taking the lead by a score of fifteen to eight, to the great surprise of the crowd and the delight of the Rockfords.  The Nationals tried hard to recover the lost ground.  The final result, however, was the success of the Forest Citys by a score of 29 to 23 in a nine innings game, twice interrupted by rain.

Later life
Late in life, Chadwick continued editing the Spalding Base Ball Guides and producing a column for the Brooklyn Daily Eagle. In late 1905, he wrote the editor of The New York Times to propose widening of the baseball bat to overcome the advantage that pitchers had established in the game. In his letter, Chadwick noted that some cricket experts had advocated for the narrowing of the cricket bat to bring balance to the advantage that belonged to the batter in that game.

In the winter before the 1908 baseball season, Chadwick was struck by an automobile and was bedridden for several weeks. He recovered and attended an exhibition game at the Polo Grounds the week before the season began. He caught a cold while at the game, and the illness worsened when he attended an Opening Day game at Washington Park in Brooklyn.

On April 19, Chadwick was moving furniture from the fourth floor of his apartment to the second floor when he fell unconscious. He was diagnosed with pneumonia and heart failure. He awakened briefly and asked about the game between Brooklyn and New York, but he died the next day. Henry Chadwick is interred at Green-Wood Cemetery in Brooklyn, New York.

Legacy
For his contributions to the game of baseball, he was elected to the Baseball Hall of Fame by the Veterans Committee in 1938. He was inducted in the same ceremony as Alexander Cartwright.

In 2009, the Society for American Baseball Research (SABR) established the Henry Chadwick Award to honor the outstanding contributions of baseball researchers. Bill James and John Thorn are among the award's recipients.

A collection of historical baseball items, which featured a letter written by Chadwick on the origins of baseball, sold at auction in 2004 for $310,500.

Chadwick was inducted to the Suffolk Sports Hall of Fame during 2020.

Chadwick, through the Spalding Athletic Library collection, added "The Ancient History of Base Ball" in 1867 and "Technical Terms of Base Ball" in 1897.

Notes

References
Tygiel, Jules. Past Time.
Schwarz, Alan (2004). The Numbers Game: Baseball's Lifelong Fascination With Statistics. New York: Thomas Dunne Books.
Schiff, Andrew (2008). "The Father of Baseball": A Biography of Henry Chadwick. Jefferson, North Carolina: McFarland.

External links

 Hall of Fame graves – Gravesites of Baseball Hall of Famers
 
 
 The Game of Base Ball (1868)  – Complete text of Chadwick's 1868 book
 Review of "The Father of Baseball: A Biography of Henry Chadwick"
 
 Green-Wood Cemetery Burial Search

1824 births
1908 deaths
National Baseball Hall of Fame inductees
American sportswriters
Baseball developers
Baseball writers
English emigrants to the United States
Burials at Green-Wood Cemetery
Sports statisticians